Koggola railway station is a railway station on the coastal railway line of Sri Lanka. 

The station is situated between Kathaluwa and Habaraduwa railway stations and is  along the railway line from the Colombo Fort Railway Station. The trains run multiple services to Colombo Fort and Matara daily.

Continuity

References

Railway stations on the Coastal Line
Railway stations in Galle District